Enemy (also known as Fatal Mission) is a 1990 American action/adventure film directed by George Rowe and starring Peter Fonda, who also co-wrote the screenplay.

Plot
A CIA agent posing as a journalist (Peter Fonda) assassinates a North Vietnamese official then escapes into the jungle, where he comes across a beautiful female spy (Tia Carrere). At first they're enemies, but come to the realization that they must work together if they want to get out alive.

Cast
Peter Fonda as Ken Andrews
Tia Carrere as Mai Chang
Mako as Trang
James Mitchum as Maj. Bauer

Production
Enemy was filmed in the Philippines in 1988.

References

External links

1990 films
1990s action adventure films
Cold War spy films
Vietnam War films
Films about the Central Intelligence Agency
Films shot in the Philippines
American action adventure films
1990s English-language films
1990s American films